This is a list of people who either were born in Ithaca, New York or who lived there other than when attending Cornell University or Ithaca College. The county in which Ithaca resides, Tompkins County, New York, is ranked eighth in all 3,144 U.S. counties for the highest density of culturally notable baby boomers.

Lavilla Esther Allen, writer, poet, reader
A.R. Ammons, resident, poet, Cornell professor
Benedict Anderson, political scientist, writer, Cornell professor, author of Imagined Communities 
Liberty Hyde Bailey (1858–1954), resident, horticulturist, botanist and Cornell professor
Iris Barbura (1912–1969), Romanian-born dancer, choreographer, and teacher of modern dance
Josh Bard, native, professional baseball player, San Diego Padres, catcher
Hans Bethe, resident, physicist, Nobel Prize winner, Cornell professor, head of theoretical division of the Manhattan Project
Urie Bronfenbrenner, Cornell professor, Cornell board of trustees, founder of Head Start
Dustin Brown, native, ice hockey player, Stanley Cup champion, former captain of Los Angeles Kings
 Marie and Annie Burns, residents, singer-songwriters
John H. Camp, former U.S. Congressman
Stephen L. Carter, native, Yale professor, legal scholar and author
Philip N. Cohen, sociologist
Alex Compton, professional basketball player
Anna Coogan, resident, singer-songwriter
Alonzo B. Cornell, native, Governor of New York, 1880–1882, son of Ezra Cornell
Ezra Cornell, resident, founder of Cornell University
Ann Coulter, resident, graduate of Cornell University, conservative author and commentator
Kyle Dake, Olympic freestyle wrestler, won four NCAA Wrestling championships in four different weight classes while at Cornell University
Amasa Dana, former U.S. Congressman
Buck Dharma, resident, co-founder and lead guitarist of Blue Öyster Cult
Asia Kate Dillon, native, actor, producer, director
Johnny Dowd, resident, musician
Robert Earle, resident, broadcaster, GE College Bowl moderator (1962–1970)
Julius Eastman, composer, pianist and singer
Adam C. Engst, native, resident, publisher of TidBITS and Take Control ebook series
Richard Feynman, resident, physicist, Cornell professor, Nobel Prize winner
Carl Frederick, resident, science-fiction author
Alice Fulton, resident, poet, Cornell professor, MacArthur Fellow
Juan Pablo Galavis, native, former professional soccer player, star of The Bachelor season 18
John H. Gear, native, Senator and Governor of Iowa
George Gorse, art historian
Greg Graffin, resident, lead singer of punk band Bad Religion
Alex Haley, native, author of Roots: The Saga of an American Family and the Autobiography of Malcolm X
Brian Hall, author
Richard W. Hubbell, Wisconsin politician
Karel Husa, resident, Pulitzer-Prize winning composer
 Ricky Jay, magician, historian, actor, writer and scholar
Jon Jones, resident, mixed martial artist, UFC light heavyweight champion
David Lee, resident, physicist, Cornell professor, Nobel Prize winner
David Lehman, resident, poet
J. Robert Lennon, resident, author of Mailman and Happyland
James L. Linderman, former Wisconsin State Assemblyman
Richard V. E. Lovelace, astrophysicist and plasma physicist at Cornell.
Norman Malcolm, resident, philosopher, worked at Cornell
Mary McDonnell, native, actress in Dances with Wolves, Independence Day, Battlestar Galactica
Matthew F. McHugh, resident, Democratic member of the United States House of Representatives, New York's 27th congressional district, 1975–1983, New York's 28th congressional district, 1983–1993
Howard B. Meek, educator; founded and was the first dean of Cornell University School of Hotel Administration
Robert Moog, ex-resident (1934-2005), engineer, pioneer of electronic music, inventor of the Moog synthesizer, creator of Moog Music originally named R. A. Moog Co. and Big Briar
Tim Moresco, native, professional football player, defensive back, New York Jets
Vladimir Nabokov, resident, Cornell professor, author of Lolita and other works
Benjamin Netanyahu, resident during portion of childhood (father was a Cornell professor), Prime Minister of Israel 1996–1999, 2009–present
Nicholas Nicastro, resident, novelist, filmmaker, graduate of Cornell University ('85)
Lonnie Park, native, musician, Grammy nominee
Roy H. Park, resident, media executive, founder of Park Communications and the Park Foundation
Harry Partch, resident, composer
Bre Pettis, native, entrepreneur, cofounder and CEO of MakerBot Industries
Stephen (Steve) Poleskie, resident, artist and writer, Cornell professor emeritus, work in Metropolitan Museum and Museum of Modern Art
Thomas Pynchon, resident, author, winner of the U.S. National Book Award for Fiction in 1973
Robert C. Richardson, resident, physicist, Cornell professor, Nobel Prize winner
Kurt Riley, songwriter, performer, and rock and roll musician
Hank Roberts, resident, cellist and composer
Flora Rose (1874–1959), resident, scientist, nutritionist, and co-director of what would become New York State College of Human Ecology at Cornell
Frank Rosenblatt, resident, psychologist and computer scientist, Cornell professor, and founder of Chateau Rosenblatt
Carl Sagan, resident, astronomer, Cornell professor, popularizer of science, and author and host of Cosmos
Nick Sagan, native, novelist and screenwriter, Ithaca College professor
Sasha Sagan, native, author, screenplay writer, film producer
Tim Sale, native, comic book illustrator
Eugene Schuyler, American diplomat
George W. Schuyler, New York State Treasurer
Walter S. Schuyler, U.S. Army brigadier general
Megan Shull, native, author of books for children and young adults
Father Robert S. Smith, resident, Catholic priest, author, and educator
Louisa Rachel Solomon, native before settling in Brooklyn, New York, singer in The Shondes
Steve Squyres, resident, astronomer, Cornell professor, principal investigator of the Mars Exploration Rover Mission
Cynthia Morgan St. John, native; Wordsworthian, book collector, and author
Steven Strogatz, resident, mathematician, Cornell professor, author
Steven Stucky, resident, classical composer, Cornell professor, Pulitzer Prize winner
William H. Thomas, resident, geriatrician, novelist, Ashoka Fellow, Heinz Award winner, author of What are Old People For?
Henry S. Walbridge, former U.S. Congressman
David Foster Wallace, native, novelist
Alfred Wells, former U.S. Congressman
E.B. White, resident, novelist, author of Charlotte's Web and co-author of The Elements of Style
Robert R. Wilson, resident, physicist, head of the Cyclotron group of the Manhattan Project
Ludwig Wittgenstein, resident, philosopher, invited to live in Ithaca by his friend and pupil Norman Malcolm
Paul Wolfowitz, native, academic, Deputy Secretary of Defense (2001–2005), president of the World Bank (2005-2007)
Christopher Woodrow, resident, film producer
X Ambassadors, natives, band members Sam Harris, Casey Harris and Noah Feldshuh
Alexi Zentner, resident, novelist, faculty member at Binghamton University; his 2019 novel Copperhead is set in a fictional town which resembles Ithaca

References

Ithaca, New York
Ithaca